Moacyr José Vitti (November 30, 1940 – June 26, 2014) was a Catholic archbishop.

Ordained to the priesthood in 1967, Vitti was named titular bishop of Sita and auxiliary bishop of the Roman Catholic Archdiocese of Curitiba, Brazil in 1988. In 2002 he was named bishop of the Roman Catholic Diocese of Piracicaba and then in 2004 was appointed Archbishop of Curitiba. He died on June 26, 2014, at the age of 73.

Notes

1940 births
2014 deaths
21st-century Roman Catholic archbishops in Brazil
Roman Catholic archbishops of Curitiba
Roman Catholic bishops of Piracicaba